Goran Jevtić (born 10 August 1970) is a Serbian footballer who played as a defender.

Club career
He played for FK Partizan in the Yugoslav First League in the seasons 1988–89 and 1989–90 making 3 appearances in total. He then played with Ulsan Hyundai FC of the South Korean K League, then known as Hyundai Horangi.

References

External links
 

1970 births
Living people
Association football defenders
Serbian footballers
FK Partizan players
Yugoslav First League players
K League 1 players
Ulsan Hyundai FC players
Expatriate footballers in South Korea